Davis–Besse Nuclear Power Station is a 894 megawatt (MW), nuclear power plant, located northeast of Oak Harbor, Ohio in Ottawa County, Ohio. It has a single pressurized water reactor.  Davis–Besse is operated by Energy Harbor.

Throughout its operation, Davis–Besse has been the site of several safety incidents that affected the plant's operation. According to the Nuclear Regulatory Commission (NRC), Davis–Besse has been the source of two of the top five most dangerous nuclear incidents in the United States since 1979. The most severe occurring in March 2002, when maintenance workers discovered corrosion had eaten a football-sized hole into the reactor vessel head. The NRC kept Davis–Besse shut down until March 2004, so that FirstEnergy was able to perform all the necessary maintenance for safe operations. The NRC imposed an over $5 million fine, its largest fine ever to a nuclear power plant, against FirstEnergy for the actions that led to the corrosion. The company paid an additional $28 million in fines under a settlement with the United States Department of Justice (DOJ).

Davis–Besse was expected to close in 2020 as it is no longer profitable to run when competing against natural gas plants. Plans were updated indicating possible shut down by May 31, 2020. However, Ohio House Bill 6 was signed into law in July 2019 which added a fee to residents' utility bills that funded subsidies of $150 million per year to Davis–Besse and the Perry Nuclear Generating Station to keep both plants operational. However, the bill was alleged to be part of the Ohio nuclear bribery scandal revealed by the United States Department of Justice (DOJ) in July 2020.

Location and history 
The plant only utilizes , with  devoted to the Ottawa National Wildlife Refuge. The entrance to the Magee Marsh Wildlife Area is approximately 5 miles east of the power station. The official name according to the U.S. Energy Information Administration is the Davis–Besse Nuclear Generating Station. It is the 57th commercial power reactor to commence building in the United States of America (construction began on September 1, 1970) and the 50th to come on-line July 31, 1978. The plant was originally jointly owned by Cleveland Electric Illuminating (CEI) and Toledo Edison (TE) and was named for former TE Chairman John K. Davis and former CEI Chairman Ralph M. Besse.

Unit One 

Unit One is an 879 MWe pressurized water reactor supplied by Babcock & Wilcox.  The reactor was shut down from 2002 until early 2004 for safety repairs and upgrades. In 2012 the reactor supplied 7101.700 GWh of electricity

Units Two and Three 

In 1973, two more reactors were also ordered from Babcock & Wilcox. However, construction on Units Two and Three never commenced, and these two units were officially canceled in 1981.

Electricity Production

Incident history

1977 first stuck-open pilot-operated relief valve 
On September 24, 1977, the relief valve for the reactor pressurizer failed to close when the reactor, running at only 9% power, shut down because of a disruption in the feedwater system.

1985 loss of feedwater event 
On June 9, 1985, the main feedwater pumps, used to supply water to the reactor steam generators, shut down.  A control room operator then attempted to start the auxiliary (emergency) feedwater pumps.  These pumps both tripped on overspeed conditions because of operator error.  This incident was originally classified an "NRC Unusual Event" (the lowest classification the NRC uses) but it was later determined that it should have been classified a "site area emergency".

1998 tornado 
On June 24, 1998 the station was struck by an F2 tornado. The plant's switchyard was damaged and access to external power was disabled. The plant's reactor automatically shut down at 8:42 pm and an alert (the next to lowest of four levels of severity) was declared at 9:18 pm. The plant's emergency diesel generators powered critical facility safety systems until external power could be restored.

2002 reactor head hole 

In March 2002, plant staff discovered that the borated water that serves as the reactor coolant had leaked from cracked control rod drive mechanisms directly above the reactor and eaten through more than six inches (150 mm) of the carbon steel reactor pressure vessel head over an area roughly the size of a football (see photo).  This significant reactor head wastage on the exterior of the reactor vessel head left only  of stainless steel cladding holding back the high-pressure (~2155 psi, 14.6 MPa) reactor coolant.  A breach most likely would have resulted in a massive loss-of-coolant accident, in which reactor coolant would have jetted into the reactor's containment building and resulted in emergency safety procedures to protect from core damage or meltdown.  Because of the location of the reactor head damage, such a jet of reactor coolant might have damaged adjacent control rod drive mechanisms, hampering or preventing reactor shut-down.  As part of the system reviews following the accident, significant safety issues were identified with other critical plant components, including the following:
 the containment sump that allows the reactor coolant to be reclaimed and reinjected into the reactor;
 the high pressure injection pumps that would reinject such reclaimed reactor coolant;
 the emergency diesel generator system;
 the containment air coolers that would remove heat from the containment building;
 reactor coolant isolation valves; and
 the plant's electrical distribution system.

The resulting corrective operational and system reviews and engineering changes took two years.  Repairs and upgrades cost $600 million, and the Davis–Besse reactor was restarted in March 2004. To replace the reactor vessel head, FirstEnergy purchased one from the mothballed Midland Nuclear Power Plant in Midland, Michigan.

The NRC determined that this incident was the fifth-most dangerous nuclear incident in the United States since 1979, and imposed its largest fine ever — more than $5 million — against FirstEnergy for the actions that led to the corrosion.

Criminal prosecutions 
In January 2006, First Energy, the owner of Davis–Besse, acknowledged a series of safety violations by former workers, and entered into a deferred prosecution agreement with the United States Department of Justice (DOJ).  The deferred prosecution agreement related to the March 2002 incident.  The deferment granted by the NRC were based on letters from Davis–Besse engineers stating that previous inspections were adequate. However, those inspections were not as thorough as the company suggested, as proved by the material deficiency discovered later.  In any case, because FirstEnergy cooperated with investigators on the matter, they were able to avoid more serious penalties. The company paid $28 million under a settlement with the Justice Department.  $23.7 million of that were fines, with an additional $4.3 million to be contributed to various groups, including the National Park Service, the U.S. Fish and Wildlife Service, Habitat for Humanity, and the University of Toledo as well as to pay some costs related to the federal investigation.

Two former employees and one former contractor were indicted for statements made in multiple documents and one videotape, over several years, for hiding evidence that the reactor pressure vessel was being corroded by boric acid.  The maximum penalty for the three was 25 years in prison.  The indictment mentions that other employees also provided false information to inspectors, but does not name them. In 2007, one of these men was convicted and another acquitted of hiding information from and lying to the NRC. Another jury trial in 2008 convicted the remaining engineer of similar crimes.

2003 slammer worm computer virus 
In January 2003, the plant's private network became infected with the slammer worm, which resulted in a five-hour loss of safety monitoring at the plant.

2008 discovery of tritium leak 
The NRC and Ohio Environmental Protection Agency (Ohio EPA) were notified of a tritium leak accidentally discovered during an unrelated fire inspection on October 22, 2008.  Preliminary indications suggest radioactive water did not infiltrate groundwater outside plant boundaries.

2010 replacement reactor head problems 
During a scheduled refueling outage in 2010, ultrasonic examinations performed on the control rod drive mechanism nozzles penetrating the reactor vessel closure head identified that two of the nozzles inspected did not meet acceptance criteria. FirstEnergy investigators subsequently found new cracks in 24 of 69 nozzles, including one serious enough to leak boric acid.  Crack indications required repair prior to returning the vessel head to service. Control rod drive nozzles were repaired using techniques proven at other nuclear facilities. The plant resumed operation in 2010. The existing reactor vessel head was scheduled for replacement in 2011.

2011 shield building cracks 
An October 2011 shutdown of the plant for maintenance revealed a 30 foot long hairline crack in the concrete shield building around the containment vessel.

2012 reactor coolant pump seal pinhole leak 
On June 6, 2012, an approximately 0.1 gpm pinhole spray leakage was identified from a weld in a seal of the reactor coolant pump during a routine reactor coolant system walkdown inspection.  The plant entered limited operations, and root cause analysis was undertaken.

2015 steam leak shutdown 
On May 9, 2015, a steam leak in the turbine building caused FirstEnergy operators to declare an 'Unusual Event' and shut the reactor down until repairs could be made.  The plant was brought back online and synchronized with the local power grid at May 12 after repairs were completed.

Future 
The facility's original nuclear operating license was set to expire on April 22, 2017. In August 2006, FirstEnergy Nuclear Operating Company (FENOC) submitted a letter of intent to renew. The submission date for the application was August 10, 2010. On December 8, 2015, the NRC granted a 20-year license extension to expire on April 22, 2037. On March 31, 2018, FirstEnergy Nuclear Operating Company filed for Bankruptcy protection. Around that time, the company indicated it would close the nuclear plant. In 2019, Ohio lawmakers debated a $9/MWh subsidy to keep Davis–Besse open. House Bill 6 was signed into law on July 23, 2019, and FirstEnergy announced it would refuel Davis–Besse and rescind its deactivation notice on July 24, 2019. It was later learned that the bill itself was a part of a public corruption scheme revealed by the Justice Department in July 2020. (→ Ohio nuclear bribery scandal)

Seismic risk
The Nuclear Regulatory Commission's estimate of the risk each year of an earthquake intense enough to cause core damage to the reactor at Davis–Besse was 1 in 149,254, according to an NRC study published in August 2010.

Surrounding population 

The 2010 U.S. population within  of Davis–Besse was 18,635, an increase of 14.2 percent in a decade, according to an analysis of U.S. Census data for msnbc.com. The 2010 U.S. population within  was 1,791,856, an increase of 1.4 percent since 2000. Cities within  include Sandusky, Ohio, ; Toledo, Ohio ; and Detroit, Michigan,  (distance to the city centers).

The cooling tower for Davis–Besse stands at 493 feet above the surrounding area, making it a major landmark around the western end of Lake Erie. The tower is visible from the Michigan and Ontario shores and on clear days the condensing steam plume can be seen from Bowling Green, Ohio, over 40 miles away.

See also

 Nuclear reactor accidents in the United States
 Pilot-operated relief valve

References

External links
Davis–Besse Pressurized Water Reactor Information from the U.S. Nuclear Regulatory Commission
Union of Concerned Scientists report on Davis–Besse
U.S. Nuclear Regulatory Commission's "Davis–Besse Lessons Learned Task Force" (with links to the Task Force Report)

Energy infrastructure completed in 1978
Towers completed in 1978
Civilian nuclear power accidents
Disasters in Ohio
Nuclear power plants in Ohio
Buildings and structures in Ottawa County, Ohio
Towers in Ohio
Nuclear power stations using pressurized water reactors
FirstEnergy
Nuclear accidents and incidents in the United States
Non-renewable resource companies established in 1978